Ellesmere Choi Chi-kin (born 28 December 1968) is a Hong Kong television actor for TVB. He attended TVB's training classes in 1993.

Filmography

TV series
A Great Way to Care (2011)
In the Eye of the Beholder (2010)
His True Father (2009)
The Threshold of a Persona (2009)
The King of Snooker (2009)
The Winter Melon Tale (2009)
E.U. (2009)
ICAC Investigators 2009 (2009)
Last One Standing (2008)
Legend of the Demigods (2008)
The Money-Maker Recipe (2008)
The Master of Tai Chi (2008)
The Slicing of the Demon (2007)
The Drive of Life (TVB-CCTV co-production, 2007)
On the First Beat (2007)
War and Destiny (2007)
Ten Brothers (2007)
C.I.B. Files (2006)
Love Guaranteed (2006)
Forensic Heroes (2006)
Below the Lion Rock (2006)
Revolving Doors of Vengeance (2005)
Women on the Run (2005, guest)
Twin of Brothers (2004)
Triumph in the Skies (2003)
Seed of Hope (2003)
Not Just a Pretty Face (2003)
The 'W' Files (2003)
Perish in the Name of Love (2003)
Witness to a Prosecution II (2003)
Back to Square One (2003)
Take My Word For It (2002)
Burning Flame II (2002)
The Awakening Story (2001)
Seven Sisters (2001)
Armed Reaction III (2001)
Virtues of Harmony (2001)
Colourful Life (2001)
The Kung Fu Master (2000)
The Legendary Four Aces (2000)
Game of Deceit (1999)
Untraceable Evidence II (1999)
Detective Investigation Files III (1997)
Fate of the Clairvoyant (1994)

External links
Hong Kong Cinemagic: Ellesmere Choi Chi Kin

1968 births
20th-century Hong Kong male actors
Hong Kong male television actors
TVB veteran actors
Living people
21st-century Hong Kong male actors